The 2019 TCR Hill Climb Touring Car Series was set to be the first season of the TCR Hill Climb Touring Car Series. The season would have begun on 4 May in Eschdorf, Luxembourg and ended on 22 September in Sankt Agatha, Austria. However, on 24 April 2019 it was announced by Auto Sport Switzerland that the TCR Hill Climb Touring Car Series Trophy will be postponed until 2020 due to lack of entries with only 2 confirmed drivers at the time of announcement.

Teams and drivers

Calendar and results 
Six events were scheduled for the season.

Notes

External links 
 

Hill Climb Touring Car Series
TCR Hill Climb Touring Car Series